Ratigan is a surname. Notable people with the surname include:

 William Ratigan  (1910–1984), American author
 Dylan Ratigan (1972–present), American television show host
 The Dylan Ratigan Show, broadcast on MSNBC

Fictional characters
 Professor Ratigan, a character from the children's book Basil of Baker Street who appears as the main antagonist in the animated Disney film The Great Mouse Detective

See also
Rattigan